Stefan Rachoń (1906–2001) was a Polish violinist.

1906 births
2001 deaths
Polish violinists
Male violinists
20th-century violinists
20th-century male musicians